The Italian 2nd Eritrean Division, also known as the Second Eritrean Division or II Division Indigini (Native), was an Italian Infantry division used in the Second Italo-Abyssinian War in 1935.  It was formed from the Eritrean Ascari of the Battalion indigeni (Native Battalions) who provided the regular colonial forces of Italian Eritrea.

During the Battle of Maychew the Division took heavy losses against attacks from the elite Ethiopian Imperial Guard.
The Division was dissolved in 1936 after the hostilities had ended.

Organization 
2nd Natives Division - Gen. Achille Vaccarisi 
 2nd Mixed Brigade - Brig. Gen. Lorenzo Dalmazzo
 3rd Native Battalion Group 
 V "Ameglio" Native Battalion 
 XXI "Fulmine" Native Battalion 
 7th Native Battalion Group 
 IV "Toselli" Native Battalion 
 XIX "Cafaro" Native Battalion 
 XXII Native Battalion 
 2nd Mountain Artillery Battalion (65L17)
 4th Mixed Brigade - Brig. Gen. Gustavo Pesenti
 4th Native Battalion Group 
 IX "Guastoni" Native Battalion 
 XII Native Battalion 
 XVII "Nebri" Native Battalion 
 8th Native Battalion Group 
 VIII "Gamerra" Native Battalion 
 XX Native Battalion 
 4th Mountain Artillery Battalion (65L17)

Note:
 X and XXV Native Battalions were detached from the Division.

Commanders
 gen. Achille Vaccarisi (1935.05.01 – 1936.01.24)
 gen. Lorenzo Dalmazzo (1936.01.24 – 1936.04.26)

References 

Divisions of Italy of the Second Italo-Ethiopian War